James Young Deer (April 1, 1876 – April 6, 1946), also known as J. Younger Johnson or Jim Young Deer, was actually born James Young Johnson in Washington, D.C. Although he was identified in the early Hollywood trade paper Moving Picture World as of the Winnebago Tribe of Nebraska, his ancestry is of the Nanticoke people of Delaware. He became an early film actor, director, writer, and producer. He is believed to be the first Native American filmmaker/producer in Hollywood. Together with his wife and partner Lillian St. Cyr, Winnebago, the couple were labeled an "influential force" in the production of one-reel Westerns during the first part of the silent film era. Their films, along with several others of the silent era, were notable for portraying Native Americans in a positive light.

Questions were raised about Young Deer's Winnebago background when film historians were unable to verify much about his origins, and he was not listed on the Winnebago tribal rolls in the early 20th century.

Early life 
Young Deer was born in the "Old Southwest" District of Washington, D.C. to George Durham Johnson and Emma Margaret Young. Census records indicated his parents were mulatto, although the term was often ambiguously used. Young Deer (i.e., James Johnson) entered the U.S. Navy on October 8, 1898 for three years during the Spanish–American War, but he was apparently disillusioned with the Navy's "great prejudices."

Newspapers instead boasted about how he supposedly performed as a cowboy with the Barnum and Bailey Circus and Miller Brothers' 101 Ranch Wild West Show, riding as a son of the Wild West.

Marriage and family 
After meeting in Washington, D.C., Young Deer was married on April 9, 1906, to actress Lillian St. Cyr, who was known by her stage name of Red Wing. Born on the Winnebago Reservation near Omaha, she was a member of the Winnebago Tribe of Nebraska through her parents Mitchell St. Cyr and Julia Decora. St. Cyr was best known for her lead role in The Squaw Man (1914 film).

Career 
Young Deer began acting in 1909 in New York in several one-reel Westerns that year. Among the film companies for which he worked were Kalem, Lubin, Vitagraph, and Biograph. He worked at one of the first independent film companies, the New York Motion Picture Company, under the Bison trademark.

In 1910, Young Deer was hired to direct for Pathé Frères. The French-based studio in Jersey City was faced with criticism that their movies were not realistic in their portrayals of the Old West, so they sent Young Deer to Edendale in Los Angeles to make Indian-themed films. His wife Red Wing acted in many of his films. Young Deer eventually ran the company's West Coast Studio operations in Edendale.

Young Deer acted in, wrote, or directed approximately 150 silent movies at Pathé's West Coast Studio.

Influence of work 
By 1910, one-fifth of American films were Westerns, and companies worked to establish national dominance in the genre. In these early years, American Indians were "generally portrayed in a positive way," and directors often hired Native Americans as actors. Movie historian William K. Everson wrote, "[D]uring this period the Indian became accepted as a symbol of integrity, stoicism, and reliability ..."

Young Deer's films have been noted as early Westerns "without the cliches of hostile Indian warriors or wagon train attacks", although several studios at the time, especially Kalem, also portrayed Indians in a unique and favorable light. The combined talent of Young Deer and St. Cyr was due to several factors.  She was educated at Carlisle and had some knowledge of Indian culture, and during the early 1900s, the film industry was adaptable and experimental.

Later years 
Young Deer encountered legal troubles in California in 1913, when a 15-year-old girl alleged he assaulted her. Young Deer went overseas, working first in Great Britain. In 1914 he worked in London, shooting thrillers for British and Colonial Films that included The Queen of the London Counterfeiters and The Black Cross Gang. During World War I, a few writers have said he created documentaries in France, although no one has been able to substantiate this claim.

After he returned from Great Britain in 1914, Young Deer had a hard time finding work, as Westerns were less popular for a time. He was said to operate an acting school in San Francisco. In the 1930s, he worked occasionally as a second-unit director on independently produced low-budget B movies and serials. In July 1930, he traveled to Arizona to marry Helen Gilchrist, who died in 1937. Young Deer died in New York City on April 6, 1946 and was buried in the Long Island National Cemetery as James Young Johnson, veteran of the Spanish–American War.

Many of his early films are now lost. However, in 2008 the Library of Congress added White Fawn's Devotion, one of Young Deer's few surviving pictures, to its National Film Registry.

Films

Director 

 Lieutenant Daring RN and the Water Rats (1924)
 The Stranger (1920/I) (as James Youngdeer)
 Who Laughs Last (1920)
 The Savage (1913)
 The Unwilling Bride (1912)
 The Squaw Man's Sweetheart (1912)
 Red Deer's Devotion (1911)
 The Yaqui Girl (1910)
 Cowboy Justice (1910)
 An Indian's Gratitude (1910)
 A Cheyenne Brave (1910)
 The Red Girl and the Child (1910)
 Under Both Flags (1910)
 White Fawn's Devotion: A Play Acted by a Tribe of Red Indians in America (1910) (uncredited)
 Red Wing's Gratitude (1909)
 For Her Sale; or, Two Sailors and a Girl (1909)
 The Falling Arrow (1909)

Actor 

 The Man of Courage (1922) .... Aquila
 Under Handicap (1917) (as James Youngdeer) .... Lonesome Pete
 Against Heavy Odds (1914)
 The Unwilling Bride (1912)
 Little Dove's Romance (1911)
 Red Deer's Devotion (1911)
 Young Deer's Return (1910) .... Young Deer
 The Red Girl and the Child (1910)
 The Indian and the Cowgirl (1910)
 The Cowboy and the Schoolmarm (1910)
 Young Deer's Gratitude (1910) .... Young Deer
 The Ten of Spades; or, A Western Raffle (1910)
 Young Deer's Bravery (1909) .... Young Deer
 Red Wing's Gratitude (1909)
 The Mended Lute (1909) .... Indian
 The True Heart of an Indian (1909) … aka A True Indian's Heart (USA)

Writer 
 Lieutenant Daring RN and the Water Rats (1924) (writer)
 Neck and Noose (1919) (story) (as Jim Youngdeer)
 White Fawn's Devotion: A Play Acted by a Tribe of Red Indians in America (1910) (uncredited)

Notes

Further reading

External links 

 
 
  
 
 

1876 births
1946 deaths
20th-century American male actors
20th-century Native Americans
American male silent film actors
Film directors from Washington, D.C.
Male actors from Washington, D.C.
Nanticoke people
Native American filmmakers
Native American male actors
People from Washington, D.C.
Silent film directors